Good Samaritan Medical Center or Good Samaritan Hospital is a 333-bed acute care hospital located in West Palm Beach, Florida.

History

The hospital opened in May 1920, replacing "Emergency Hospital" (which dated from about 1914), with 35 beds located on 12th street near the lakefront (now Palm Beach Lakes Boulevard) and Dixie Highway. Dr. William Ernest Van Landingham (1879-1973), a recent arrival and then secretary of the one-year-old Palm Beach County Medical Society, was a co-founder and the first administrator.

The Victor W. Farris Building was completed in 1988.  Another building is called Flagler Waterway.
A brick building next to Burger King has been abandoned.

In 2001, Tenet Healthcare acquired the hospital (along with St. Mary's Hospital, also located in the county).

In 2009, the Hospital celebrated its 90th anniversary.

References

External links
Official website

Hospital buildings completed in 1920
Hospital buildings completed in 1988
Hospitals in Florida
Tenet Healthcare